Mom Rajawongse Kalyanakit Kitiyakara (1929 - 1987) was a Thai cardiothoracic surgeon who trained in England and the United States. He was born in Bangkok to Nakkhatra Mangala, Prince of Chantaburi II and Bua Kitiyakara. He was the eldest brother of Sirikit, Queen of Thailand.

Biography 
Kitiyakara began his training at Guy's Hospital Medical School in London, qualifying in 1956. He moved to the United States for further training and then returned to Thailand, becoming consultant cardiothoracic surgeon at the Siraraj Hospital Medical School in Bangkok.

In 1957 he married Arun Snidvongs na Ayudhya, with whom he had two children.

In 1987 he died at age of 57 at Ramathibodi Hospital.

Professional qualifications 
 Membership of the Royal College of Surgeons 1956
 Fellowship of the Royal College of Surgeons by election 1981
 Bachelor of Medicine, Bachelor of Surgery London 1957
 Licentiate of the Royal College of Physicians 1956

Ancestry

References 

Kalyanakit Kitiyakara
Kalyanakit Kitiyakara
Kalyanakit Kitiyakara
Alumni of King's College London
Kalyanakit Kitiyakara
1929 births
1987 deaths
20th-century surgeons
Kalyanakit Kitiyakara